Jerrauld C. C. "Jay" Jones (born March 14, 1989) is an American politician and attorney serving as a member of the Virginia House of Delegates from the 89th district. In July 2020, Jones announced his candidacy for attorney general of Virginia in the 2021 election. Jones lost the Democratic primary to incumbent Mark Herring, despite receiving an endorsement from Governor Ralph Northam. In December 2021, Jones announced his resignation to focus on family.

Early life and education
Jay Jones was born in Norfolk to Jerrauld Jones and Lyn M. Simmons. He is the grandson of Hilary H. Jones, Jr. (an attorney and civil rights pioneer in Norfolk) and Corinne D. Jones (a Norfolk school teacher) and Charles and Margaret Simmons, who were tenured professors at Norfolk State University and Hampton University, respectively.

He attended Norfolk Collegiate School and graduated in 2006. Jones then went on to attend the College of William & Mary as a William & Mary Scholar. He earned a Bachelor of Arts degree in government and history. During college, Jones served as a legislative intern for Paula Miller in 2009.

Career 
After college, Jones spent two years in New York as an associate with Goldman Sachs, where he focused on risk management and credit rating advisory, focusing on natural resources and technology companies. He then returned to Virginia and earned his Juris Doctor from the University of Virginia School of Law in 2015. While in law school, Jones interned in the office of Algie Howell.

Jones serves on several boards in Hampton Roads, and is a lifelong member of the Basilica of St. Mary of the Immaculate Conception. He is a practicing trial attorney based in Norfolk, Virginia.

Virginia House of Delegates
On February 13, 2017, Jones announced his candidacy for the Virginia House of Delegates, running for the same seat his father held from 1988 to 2002. On June 13, 2017, Jones won a contested Democratic primary to become the Democratic nominee for Virginia's 89th district. On November 7, 2017, he defeated Libertarian candidate, Terry Hurst, to become the Delegate-elect for the 89th district and sworn in on January 10, 2018. He succeeded Daun Hester. Jones ran for reelection unopposed in the 2019 election cycle. Jones was appointed to the House Appropriations Committee at the beginning of his second term. In September 2019, Jones endorsed Cory Booker in the 2020 Democratic Party presidential primaries. In December 2021, Jones resigned from the Virginia House of Delegates following the announcement that he and his wife are expecting their first child in summer 2022. Jones' replacement fellow Democrat Jackie Glass was elected to succeed him in a special election held on January 11, 2022.

2021 Virginia attorney general election 

Jones was a candidate in the Democratic primary for the 2021 Virginia Attorney General election. On June 8, 2021, Jones lost the Democratic primary to incumbent Mark Herring.

Electoral history

References

Politicians from Norfolk, Virginia
African-American state legislators in Virginia
Democratic Party members of the Virginia House of Delegates
Candidates in the 2021 United States elections
College of William & Mary alumni
University of Virginia School of Law alumni
1989 births
Living people
21st-century American politicians